Kodesh may refer to:

People
Moshe Rosen (Nezer HaKodesh), (1870–1957), Polish Orthodox rabbi
Wolfie Kodesh (1918–2002), South African Communist party activist

Other uses
 Kodesh, a word meaning sacred in Hebrew; see Sacredness#Judaism

See also
Kodesh Hakodashim, meaning Holy of Holies
Sifrei Kodesh (meaning 'Holy books'), books of Jewish religious literature
Kodes (disambiguation)